Beugamel located at 32°39′54″S 147°47′04″ is a cadastral parish in Kennedy County New South Wales.

References

Parishes of Kennedy County